The Roman Catholic Diocese of Ruteng is a diocese located in the city of Ruteng in the Ecclesiastical province of Ende in Indonesia.

History
 March 8, 1951: Established as the Apostolic Vicariate of Ruteng from the Apostolic Vicariate of Isole della Piccola Sonda
 January 3, 1961: Promoted as Diocese of Ruteng

Leadership
Vicars Apostolic
 Willem van Bekkum, S.V.D. (March 8, 1951 – January 3, 1961)
 Bishops 
 Willem van Bekkum, S.V.D. (January 3, 1961 – March 10, 1972)
 Vitalis Djebarus, S.V.D. (March 17, 1973 – September 4, 1980)
 Eduardus Sangsun, S.V.D. (December 3, 1984 – October 13, 2008)
 Hubertus Leteng, (April 14, 2010 – October 11, 2017)
Apostolic Administrator: Sylvester Tung Kiem San of Denpasar
 Siprianus Hormat (November 13, 2019 – present)

References

External links
 GCatholic.org
 Catholic Hierarchy
Ruteng Diocese - Pastoral Information Media

Roman Catholic dioceses in Indonesia
Christian organizations established in 1951
Roman Catholic dioceses and prelatures established in the 20th century
1951 establishments in Indonesia